The following is a timeline of Kurdish history, comprising important legal and territorial changes and political events in Kurdistan and its predecessor states and entities. To read about the background to these events, see History of the Kurds.

20th century

21st century

References 

History of Kurdistan
Kurdish
Kurdistan